Alise Naylevna Fakhrutdinova (born 23 February 1990) is a Uzbekistani modern pentathlete. She competed in the women's event at the 2020 Summer Olympics. Fakhrutdinova is from Tatar descent.

References

External links
 

1990 births
Living people
Russian female modern pentathletes
Uzbekistani female modern pentathletes
Modern pentathletes at the 2020 Summer Olympics
Olympic modern pentathletes of Uzbekistan
Sportspeople from Moscow
Tatar sportspeople
Uzbekistani people of Tatar descent